The 2002 Unforgiven was the fifth annual Unforgiven professional wrestling pay-per-view (PPV) event produced by World Wrestling Entertainment (WWE). It was held for wrestlers from the promotion's Raw and SmackDown! brand divisions. The event took place on September 22, 2002, at Staples Center in Los Angeles, California. It was the first Unforgiven held under the WWE name, after the promotion was renamed from World Wrestling Federation (WWF) to WWE earlier that year in May, as well as the first Unforgiven held during the first brand extension that began in March.

Eight professional wrestling matches were scheduled for the event—which featured a supercard, a scheduling of more than one main bout. The main event from the SmackDown! brand featured WWE Champion Brock Lesnar fighting The Undertaker to retain the title after both men were disqualified. After the match, The Undertaker continued to attack Lesnar, throwing him through the wall of a set. The main event from the Raw brand featured World Heavyweight Champion Triple H defeating Rob Van Dam to retain the title. Four matches were featured on the undercard. The first was a singles match where Chris Benoit defeated Kurt Angle. The next was between Trish Stratus and WWE Women's Champion Molly Holly, where Stratus won and captured the title. The third was a singles match between Eddie Guerrero and Edge, in which Guerrero won. The final featured undercard match had WWE Intercontinental Champion Chris Jericho defeating Ric Flair to retain the title.

Production

Background
Unforgiven was first held by World Wrestling Entertainment (WWE) as the 21st In Your House pay-per-view (PPV) in April 1998. Following the discontinuation of the In Your House series in February 1999, Unforgiven branched off as its own PPV in September that year, becoming WWE's annual September PPV. The 2002 event was the fifth event in the Unforgiven chronology and took place on September 22 at Staples Center in Los Angeles, California. It was also the first held under the WWE name, as the promotion was renamed from World Wrestling Federation (WWF) to WWE in May. It was also the first Unforgiven held during the first brand extension that was introduced in March, a storyline subdivision in which the promotion divided its roster into two separate brands, Raw and SmackDown!, where wrestlers were exclusively assigned to perform. The 2002 event in turn featured wrestlers from both brands.

Storylines
The event featured nine professional wrestling matches, with outcomes predetermined by WWE script writers. The matches featured wrestlers portraying their characters in planned storylines that took place before, during and after the event. All wrestlers were from one of the WWE's brands--SmackDown! or Raw—the two storyline divisions in which WWE assigned its employees.

The main feud heading into Unforgiven on the SmackDown! brand was between The Undertaker and Brock Lesnar, with the two feuding over the WWE Championship. On the August 29 episode of SmackDown!, as Lesnar became exclusive to the SmackDown! brand, Stephanie McMahon made a single elimination series of matches to declare the number one contender for the championship. Kurt Angle and Chris Benoit made it to the final, but McMahon put The Undertaker in the match, which he then won. On the September 5 episode of SmackDown!, Lesnar and The Undertaker confronted each other. On the September 12 episode of SmackDown!, during The Undertaker's match with Matt Hardy, Lesnar threatened The Undertaker's wife, Sara, and attacked The Undertaker when he tried to save her. On the September 19 episode of SmackDown!, The Undertaker tried to attack Lesnar, but was stopped by Lesnar's security.

The main feud heading into Unforgiven on the Raw brand was between Triple H and Rob Van Dam for the World Heavyweight Championship. On the September 2 episode of Raw, Triple H was awarded the newly created World Heavyweight Championship by Eric Bischoff, and retained it against Ric Flair. Later that night however, Van Dam and Flair defeated Triple H and Chris Jericho in a tag team match, when Van Dam pinned Triple H. On the September 9 episode of Raw, Van Dam defeated Jericho, Jeff Hardy, and Big Show in a fatal four-way elimination match to become the number one contender for the World Heavyweight Championship. On the September 16 episode of Raw, Triple H cost Van Dam his WWE Intercontinental Championship against Jericho and in retaliation, Van Dam attacked Triple H during a title match with Hardy.

Another main feud on the SmackDown! brand was between SmackDown! General Manager, Stephanie McMahon and Raw General Manager Eric Bischoff. It all started when Billy and Chuck had a commitment ceremony on the September 12 episode of SmackDown!. The priest of the ceremony was later to be revealed as Bischoff in disguise. He had Billy and Chuck attacked by 3 Minute Warning, setting up a tag team match scheduled for Unforgiven. If 3 Minute Warning won, Stephanie would be forced to participate in "Hot Lesbian Action" with two other women. Had Billy and Chuck won, Bischoff would have had to kiss Stephanie's buttocks.

Another feud on the Raw brand was between Molly Holly and Trish Stratus for the WWE Women's Championship. Four months prior, Holly and Stratus began a feud which lead to a Women's Championship match between the two at King of the Ring in which Holly defeated Stratus to win the title. On the June 24 episode of Raw, Holly proclaimed that she had bought dignity and respect back to the Women's Championship by not being a "tramp who sleeps her way to the top" referring to Stratus. On the July 15 episode of Raw, Holly successfully defended her title against Stratus. On the September 2 episode of Raw, Stratus and Bubba Ray Dudley defeated Chris Nowinski and Holly in a mixed tag team match.

Event

Before the event aired live on pay-per-view, a dark match took place in which Rey Mysterio defeated Chavo Guerrero.

Preliminary matches 
The first match was between The Un-Americans (Lance Storm, Christian, William Regal and Test) and Kane, Goldust, Booker T and Bubba Ray Dudley. After a brawl between the teams occurred Storm performed a Superkick on Kane for a near-fall. Storm attempted a second Superkick on Kane but Kane countered the move and pinned Storm after a Chokeslam to win the match.

The second match was for the WWE Intercontinental Championship between Chris Jericho and Ric Flair. During the match, Flair targeted Jericho's left leg. Jericho missed a Lionsault on Flair, which further injured Jericho's left leg. Whilst a trainer distracted the referee, Jericho revealed that he was faking his injury and applied the Walls of Jericho on Flair. Flair submitted, resulting in Jericho retaining the title.

The third match was between Edge and Eddie Guerrero. Edge performed an Edgecution on Guerrero but Guerrero placed his foot on the bottom rope to void the pinfall. Guerrero exposed a Turnbuckle, which Edge later collided with. Guerrero pinned Edge after a Sunset Flip Powerbomb to win the match.

The fourth match was between Billy and Chuck and 3-Minute Warning (Rosey and Jamal) (with Rico). Jamal attempted to perform a Pop Up Samoan Drop on Gunn but Gunn countered the move into a Fameasser on Jamal. Rico distracted Gunn, leading to Gunn confronting Rico. Jamal pinned Gunn after a Pop Up Samoan Drop to win the match.

Main event matches 
The fifth match was for the World Heavyweight Championship between Triple H and Rob Van Dam. After a back-and-forth match, Triple H knocked the referee down. Triple H attempted a Pedigree on Van Dam but Van Dam countered the move and performed a Five Star Frog Splash on Triple H. After Van Dam checked on the referee, Triple H performed a Low Blow on Van Dam. Triple H attempted to hit Van Dam with a sledgehammer but Van Dam performed a Spinning Heel Kick on Triple H. Ric Flair interfered, retrieving the sledgehammer. Flair appeared to hit Triple H with the sledgehammer but Flair hit Van Dam with the sledgehammer, turning Flair heel. Triple H pinned Van Dam after a Pedigree to win the match.

The sixth match was for the WWE Women's Championship between Molly Holly and Trish Stratus. Stratus pinned Molly after a Stratusfaction to win the match and the title.

The seventh match was between Kurt Angle and Chris Benoit. Benoit performed a Diving Headbutt on Angle for a near-fall. Benoit applied the Crippler Crossface on Angle but Angle countered the hold into an Ankle Lock on Benoit. Benoit countered the hold into the Crippler Crossface but Angle again countered the hold into an Ankle Lock on Benoit, with Benoit touching the ropes to force Angle to break the hold. As Angle applied the Crippler Crossface on Benoit, Benoit attempted to touch the ropes but Angle pushed the ropes away. After the referee argued with Angle, Benoit pinned Angle using the ropes for leverage to win the match.

The main event was for the WWE Championship between Brock Lesnar (with Paul Heyman) and The Undertaker. During the match, the referee was distracted, allowing Lesnar to hit The Undertaker with the title belt, which caused The Undertaker to bleed. After Lesnar collided with the referee, who was knocked down, The Undertaker performed a Chokeslam on Lesnar. Matt Hardy attempted to interfere but The Undertaker performed a Last Ride on Hardy. Lesnar pushed The Undertaker, causing The Undertaker to knock the referee down, and attempted to hit The Undertaker with a chair but The Undertaker performed a Big Boot into the chair, causing the chair to hit Lesnar, and hit Lesnar with the chair, causing Lesnar to bleed. After Lesnar attacked the referee, the referee ruled the match a double disqualification. After the match, The Undertaker threw Lesnar through the stage set.

Aftermath
While the 2002 Unforgiven had featured wrestlers from both Raw and SmackDown!, the 2003 event was held exclusively for the Raw brand.

Results

References

External links
Official website

2002 in Los Angeles
Professional wrestling in Los Angeles
2002
Events in Los Angeles
2002 WWE pay-per-view events
September 2002 events in the United States